Lev Mikhaylovich Pulver (Yiddish pronunciation: Leib Pulver, European spelling: Leo Pulver), was a Russian-Jewish musician. He was an offspring of a renowned klezmorim's family.

Pulver studied violin since early childhood, at first with his father; later on, he studied with his brother-in-law, a disciple of Czech violinist Otakar Sevcik. Pulver graduated from St. Petersburg Conservatory, where he studied violin and composition under A.K. Lyadov.

Initially, he was a violinist and composer in a wandering Ukrainian theatre group. Later on, he was a symphonic concert-master and conductor, a founding member of the Stradivari Quartet. He was the musical director of the State Jewish Theatre in Moscow (the GOSET). Pulver was awarded the titles of People's Artist of RSFSR and Distinguished Arts Master of RSFSR.

Compositions 
Pulver composed incidental music for works including Shakespeare's King Lear; Sholom Aleichem's 200.000 and The Man of the Air; Adventures of Benjamin the Third after Mendele Mocher Sforim; Abraham Goldfaden's The Sorceress (in collaboration with Joseph Achron); and Zalman Shneyer's Freylekhs (in collaboration with Maximilian Shteynberg). He also composed operettas (Gulliver, Inside the Big Top, What is her name?), movie scores, songs, and Yiddish folk-song arrangements. Some of his tunes have been considered as Jewish folklore. He was one of the important musicians bridging the traditional Eastern European Jewish music with the Western classical music forms.

Artists about Lev Pulver 
L.M. Pulver has a sophisticated sense of incidental music's essence./ ... /.Pulver is especially aware of those moments in scenic plots when a direct calling for the music to sound is there. Moreover, this is not surprising: he started playing since nine years of age as a wandering weddings-musician. Thereafter, while being an already accomplished musician, he went on with playing in theaters, first at the orchestra of the Ukrainian Opera, then at the Bolshoi Theater in Moscow. His theatrical experience left a lasting impression on all of his works. His music is effectively theatrical. /Solomon Mikhoels/

... (My) father started a job at Mikhoels' Jewish Theatre .That theatre might have been considered as a musical one. In charge of the orchestra and of all the musical life (there) was an energetic gifted man – Lev Pulver. All of the music was written by him, and he conducted as well. Their productions reminded of the today's musicals. /Kirill Kondrashin/

Recordings 
A few recordings of his music are available featuring the performances of the GOSET orchestra with Solomon Mikhoels and Benjamin Zuskin, as well as by singers Solomon Khromchenko, Misha Alexandrovich, Nechama Lifshitz, Marina Gordon and actors Emil Gorovets and Boris Landau.

References 
 1.Музыка: Большой Энциклопедический словарь. М., 1998
 2.КЕЭ, том 6, кол. 885–886
 3. Leyb Pulver, "Epizodn fun mayn lebn" (עפיזאדן פון מיין לעבן), in Sovetish Heymland ("סאוועטיש היימלאנד", Moscow), 1970, no. 1-2

1883 births
1970 deaths
Jewish musicians
People from Verkhnodniprovsk
People's Artists of the RSFSR
Soviet composers
Russian Jews
Soviet musicians
Yiddish-language music